Roger Dale Carr (born July 1, 1952) is an American former professional football wide receiver who played professionally in the National Football League (NFL), primarily with the Baltimore Colts. He was selected to the Pro Bowl after the 1976 season, during which he caught 43 passes and led the NFL in both receiving yardage with 1,112 yards, and yards per catch, with 25.9.

College
Having played basketball briefly in high school, along with track and field, Carr was discovered by Louisiana Tech track coach Jim Mize.  Carr did play on the school's football team, but as a guard and punter. It was his kicking abilities that first brought him to the attention of Louisiana Tech football coach Maxie Lambright, even though he was a few years removed from playing football. Carr was able to overcome homesickness to become a college football star. In 1971, he helped the program win the league title in the Southland Conference.

After catching 29 passes for 738 yards and 8 scores his first season, Carr became a bigger part of the Tech offense. In his final two season, Tech only lost one gane and won two Division II national titles. He had a clutch catch for 21 yards for a score with 12 seconds left that helped Tech beat Boise State 38-34 in the semi-finals. Louisiana Tech would go on to beat Western Kentucky 34-0 to win their second national title. Roger Carr was named to the Little All-American team in both 1972 and 1973.

Pro career
In 1974, the Baltimore Colts selected Carr with the 24th pick in the first round, making him the second receiver selected behind Lynn Swann of the Pittsburgh Steelers. The Colts, which had played in Super Bowl III just a few season earlier, were in a rebuild mode. long time quarterback Johnny Unitas was playing in San Diego for the Chargers and the quarterbacks the Colts had were Bert Jones, a rookie, and Marty Domres, a once highly touted quarterback who'd failed to live up to expectations in San Diego. Carr only started in 8 games in his rookie season, but he caught 21 passes for 405 yards. He made his NFL debut on October 6, 1974. In a 42-38 home loss to the New England Patriots, Carr caught just one pass. In the rematch in week 11, Carr caught 2 passes for 87 yards. His best performance came in the final game of the season. Though the Colts lost to the New York Jets 45-38, Carr caught 6 passes for 91 yards.  During the 1975 season, Carr scored the first touchdown of his NFL career, an 89 yard strike from Bert Jones in Buffalo. The Colts, despite giving up three rushing touchdowns to O. J. Simpson, won the game 42-35. In 1976, he had his only 1,000 season of his career, catching 43 passes for 1,112 yards, and averaging 25.9 yards per catch. 1976 was also the only year he was selected to the pro bowl.

Carr helped the Colts win the AFC East Division from 1975 to 1977. In 1977, Carr missed several games due to a knee injury. Carr had several quality years but was never able to duplicate the success of the 1976 season. The closest he'd come to the 1,000 yard mark again was 1980, when he finished with 926 yards. On July 23, 1982, Carr was suspended by the Colts for three games due to his remarks and actions towards then new head coach Frank Kush.

Carr, who struggled to get used to the discipline requirements in college, found himself having the same issue with Kush. Kush, who coached at Arizona State for 22 seasons before landing the Colts job, ran his practices the way a drill sergeant would run his troops. The Colts were once again in rebuild mode. Quarterback Bert Jones was gone, having been released. Bruce Laird jumped from the NFL to the USFL. Mike Barnes, a starting defensive tackle, was also gone from the team. Though Kush and Colts G.M. Ernie Accorsi both said that trading Carr wasn't an option, citing Carr had one year left on his contract, Carr's teammates supported him, including long time teammate Ken Huff. Carr also stated that at that stage of his career, he had no desire to go through another rebuilding project with yet another new head coach. Shortly before the 1982 season was set to begin, the Colts gave Carr his wish. He was traded to the Seattle Seahawks.

Though Carr wasn't a starter for Seattle, which already had Steve Largent and Paul Johns entrenched at wide receiver, he still managed to catch 15 passes for 265 yards. Also working against Carr that season was the fact that half of the season was canceled due to an NFLPA strike.

He retired in 1983 after playing his final season for the San Diego Chargers. Previously, he played for the Seattle Seahawks in the 1982 season, when he caught 15 passes for 265 yards and two touchdowns and helped to provide the winning score against the Denver Broncos. His salary that year was $225,000.

Post NFL career
Carr was born in Seminole, Oklahoma, and reared in Cotton Valley in Webster Parish in northwestern Louisiana, where he still maintained his residence in 1983 at the time of his retirement as a professional player.

Carr returned as a graduate assistant to his alma mater, Louisiana Tech University in Ruston, where he played for the Bulldogs. From 2003 to 2005, he coached at the Roman Catholic-affiliated St. Frederick High School in Monroe, Louisiana. Since 2009, he has been the offensive coordinator for the Providence High School in Charlotte, North Carolina.

In 1974, Carr was honored for his athletic success by the citizens of Cotton Valley with a special day of ceremonies. Carr was inducted into the Louisiana Tech University Athletic Hall of Fame in 2007.

After his career was over, and as well as many years of reflection, Carr admitted that he could have handed his final years in Baltimore a little better. He admitted that much of his discontent stemmed from the Colts trading away Bert Jones. Carr said he'd never had the chemistry with any one quarterback. He also admitted that during their time with the Colts, Jones, who had his pilots license, would fly to Carr's hometown during the offseason. The two friends would then fly off to some other location for a workout. This was something that Carr admitted the Colts were completely unaware of.

References

External links
 Klingaman, Mike. "Catching Up With...former Colt Roger Carr," The Toy Department (The Baltimore Sun sports blog), Tuesday, October 27, 2009.

1952 births
Living people
People from Seminole, Oklahoma
People from Cotton Valley, Louisiana
Sportspeople from Ruston, Louisiana
Sportspeople from Monroe, Louisiana
Players of American football from Charlotte, North Carolina
Players of American football from Louisiana
American football wide receivers
Louisiana Tech Bulldogs football players
Baltimore Colts players
Seattle Seahawks players
San Diego Chargers players
American Conference Pro Bowl players